Cranach is a German-language surname. Notable people with the surname include:

Augustin Cranach (1554–1595), German painter
Hans Cranach (c. 1513–1537), German painter
Lucas Cranach the Elder (c. 1472–1553), German artist
Lucas Cranach the Younger (c. 1515–1586), German artist

See also
Granach
Harry Graf Kessler (1868–1937), founder of the Cranach Press

German-language surnames